Domentziolus or Domnitziolus (Δομνιτζίολος) was a brother of the Byzantine emperor Phocas (r. 602–610).

Phocas and his family were likely of Thraco-Roman origin. Phocas and Domentziolus' mother was named Domentzia. A third brother is known, named Comentiolus.

In 603, Phocas appointed Domentziolus as his magister officiorum, a post he continued to hold throughout Phocas' reign. In 610, facing the revolt of Heraclius, Domentziolus was sent by Phocas to man the Anastasian Wall. When he heard however that Heraclius' fleet had reached Abydos, he fled to Constantinople. After the overthrow and execution of Phocas, he too was executed on the orders of Heraclius, but his apparent son, the general and curopalates Domentziolus, was spared at the intercession of Theodore of Syceon.

References

Sources 
 
 

6th-century births
610 deaths
Magistri officiorum
Executed Byzantine people
7th-century Byzantine people
7th-century executions by the Byzantine Empire
Generals of Phocas